The Tamron AF 18-200mm F/3.5-6.3 XR Di II LD Aspherical [IF] Macro is a superzoom lens by Tamron, initially announced in 2005. A year later, Tamron announced the Tamron AF 18-250mm 3.5-6.3 Di II LD Aspherical [IF] Macro with a slightly larger zoom range. However, in 2008, the 18-200 model was re-released with a built-in motor for Nikon bodies lacking a motor in the body - at that time the Nikon D40, D40x and D60.

See also
Konica Minolta AF Zoom DT 18-200mm f/3.5-6.3 (D) (2699)
Sony α DT 18-200mm f/3.5-6.3 (SAL-18200)

References

http://www.dpreview.com/products/tamron/lenses/tamron_18-200_3p5-6p3_di_ii/specifications

18-200mm f/3.5-6.3 AF XR Di II LD Aspherical IF
A-mount lenses
EF-S-mount lenses
F-mount lenses
K-mount lenses
Superzoom lenses
Camera lenses introduced in 2005